Barbara Diggens (born 8 October 1949) is a former English professional squash player.

Diggens was born on 8 October 1949 and lived in Brighton, Sussex. She started playing aged 19 at the Hove Squash Club and became a professional tennis and squash coach.

Her greatest achievement was being part of the winning England team during the 1979 Women's World Team Squash Championships and she also represented England at the 1983 Women's World Team Squash Championships.

References

External links
 

English female squash players
1949 births
Living people